"Cash" is the eighth episode of British sitcom The Young Ones. It was written by Ben Elton, Rik Mayall and Lise Mayer, and directed by Paul Jackson. It was first aired on BBC Two on 15 May 1984. This particular episode is unusual in that it is filmed to enable the wall with the fireplace, which would usually be 'behind camera,' to be in view during internal scenes. In this case, the wall with the living room window becomes the 'fourth wall.'

Plot
The quartet are so poor that they are burning their clothes and belongings just to keep warm. Neil prepares meals of snow passed off as risotto, and Vyvyan goes around the neighbourhood to find winter fuel although the episode is set in September. Eventually they decide that someone needs to get a job to bring money into the house, but when the only vacancy advertised in the local paper is for the Army, Rick and Mike both rule themselves out on medical grounds (perforated eardrum and flat feet, respectively), while Vyvyan declares that he is pregnant, leaving Neil the only one to take the job.

After a poor haircut and a quick loan of Mike's suit, Neil goes to join up, but having been told not to mention it, is rejected for being a pacifist. After spotting a recruitment poster for the police, the other three throw Neil into the police station next door, where he meets Alexei Sayle's character, a Mussolini-lookalike. While the others get lucky when a lorry full of food and expensive furnishings crashes through the front window, Neil takes to his new job – arresting a bunch of his drugged-up hippie friends, where the track Electrick Gypsies by Steve Hillage is playing on the record player until he pulls the plug on it and says – "Oh no, Steve Hillage!"

Arriving home, Neil tries to arrest his flatmates, assuming they have stolen the luxury items. His harsh use of the baton forces Vyvyan into labour. Mike leaves the room, being afraid of the sight of childbirth. Instead, Vyvyan actually ends up passing wind loudly. Having been handcuffed together with Vyvyan, Rick and Neil frantically try to escape the smell but Neil is unable to find the key. Unaware, Mike comes back in, and tries to light a celebratory cigar. The flame reacts with the gas, causing the house to explode.

Characters

As with all episodes of The Young Ones, the main four characters were student housemates Mike (Christopher Ryan); Vyvyan (Adrian Edmondson); Rick (Rik Mayall) and Neil (Nigel Planer). Alexei Sayle appears as a Benito Mussolini cabaret act and police recruitment officer. DJ Alan Freeman plays God, sitting at a radio mixing desk, on the first of two occasions in the series.

Home video edits
The episode features a performance from Ken Bishop's Nice Twelve, a one-off conglomerate of high-profile rock musicians and theme writers, including Jools Holland, Simon Brint, Stewart Copeland and Chris Difford performing "Subterranean Homesick Blues" by Bob Dylan. For contractual reasons, this performance was edited out of most early home video releases in both the UK and US. On the original DVD releases, along with the edit, the scenes of the main cast that take place during the performance are also cut. The band's name is also edited out of the credits, but rather than simply erase the name, the portion of credits with the group name is cut, with the credits before and after that intersected by a thick orange line, which also shows two sets of footage playing. However, when a total list of all cast members of all twelve episodes of the series are in the credits for "Summer Holiday", the names of three of the musicians are not taken out.

The entire performance is restored to its original unedited state on The Young Ones: Complete Series One & Two DVD set released in October 2007, released in the US as The Young Ones: Extra Stoopid Edition in November 2007.

References

The Young Ones episodes
1984 British television episodes
Television shows written by Ben Elton